Žiče or Žice may refer to:

Žiče [ˈʒiːtʃɛ]
Žiče, Slovenske Konjice, a village in the Municipality of Slovenske Konjice, northeastern Slovenia
Žiče Charterhouse, a charterhouse near Žiče, (Municipality of Slovenske Konjice)
Žiče, Domžale, a village in the Municipality of Radomlje, northern Slovenia
Žice, a village in the Municipality of Sveta Ana, northeastern Slovenia